Female Half-Length Nude with Hat is an oil on canvas painting by German artist Ernst Ludwig Kirchner, executed in 1911. It his held at the Museum Ludwig in Cologne.

History and description
The painting has the dimensions of 76 by 70 cm. It bears the inventory number WRM 2752 (WRM = Wallraf-Richartz-Museum). Kirchner's signature is on the top left: EL Kirchner II.

Kirchner's half-nude painting shows Doris Große, known as Dodo, with whom he was together from 1909 to 1911, when he moved from Dresden to Berlin. Doris Große was a milliner and was a designer of extravagant hats for women. The painting depicts her wearing a hat, with an absent look, while she is partially undressed and shows her breasts. In addition to influences from French Fauvism, in which the motif of a beautiful woman with a hat often appeared, for example in the work of Alexej von Jawlensky, the sparse lines of the drawing and the restrained color scheme are elements taken from non-European art. In contrast to comparable depictions of passive sensuality in the motif of a naked woman in Henri Matisse, in Kirchner, the woman has a more tense and conscious posture, as he knew from the depictions of the Indian wall paintings in Ajanta. He also abandoned the two-dimensionality he had previously practiced in favor of a more plastic visual effect.

The painting has the particularity of having on his back the unfinished canvas Fränzi in Wiesen from 1910, which depicted the muse and popular model for the Brücke artists, Lina Franziska Fehrmann, known as Fränzi.

Provenance
The painting originally belonged to the Adolphe Baseler collection in Paris, then it was acquired by the American art dealer Sam Salz, who was then living in Paris. In 1924, it came to the collection of the lawyer Josef Haubrich in Cologne, where it survived the Nazi regimen and, like the entire Haubrich collection, was donated to the Wallraf-Richartz Museum in Cologne in 1946. It remained there until 1976. Since then it has been exhibited in the Museum Ludwig, founded in 1976. Since 1922, the painting has been shown in numerous international exhibitions as an outstanding work by Kirchner.

References

1910 paintings
Paintings by Ernst Ludwig Kirchner
Collections of the Museum Ludwig
Nude art